In 1995, it was estimated that there were 50,000 people of Cape Verdean descent or national origin in Portugal.  By 2000, this estimation rose to 83,000 people, of which 90% resided in Greater Lisbon."  In 2008, Portugal’s National Statistics Institute estimated that there were 68,145 Cape Verdeans who legally resided in Portugal.  This made up "15.7% of all foreign nationals living legally in the country."

Notable people

Germano Almeida, writer
Ângela Maria Fonseca Spínola
Cláudio Aguiar
Jorge Andrade
Hernâni Borges
Nelson Évora
Arlindo Gomes Semedo
José Gonçalves
Sara Tavares
Néné da Luz
Nélson Marcos
Sandro Mendes
Vítor Moreno
Nani
Nilton Fernandes
Pedro Pelé 
Rolando
Manuel Estêvão Sanches
Ernesto da Conceição Soares
Marco Soares
Edson Rolando Silva Sousa 
José Veiga
Nélson Veiga
João Gomes, basketball player
Lura, singer
Oceano da Cruz
Renato Sanches
Yorgan De Castro, mixed martial artist
 Márcio Fernandes

References

External links
Central Intelligence Agency.  "Portugal."  The World Factbook.  Retrieved October 18, 2007.

African diaspora in Portugal
Ethnic groups in Portugal
 
Cape Verdean diaspora